The dwarf sicklefin chimaera (Neoharriotta carri) is a species of fish in the family Rhinochimaeridae found in Colombia and Venezuela. Its natural habitat is open seas. It is threatened by habitat loss.

References

Neoharriotta
Taxonomy articles created by Polbot
Fish described in 1966